St. Francis Institute of Technology (SFIT) in Mumbai, India, is an engineering college named after Francis of Assisi, the 12th-century Italian saint. The college is accredited by the ISO, National Board of Accreditation, approved by the AICTE and is affiliated to the University of Mumbai.

The college is run by the Society of Franciscan Brothers, with special consideration given to Roman Catholic students. It offers undergraduate, post-graduate, and doctoral courses in engineering.  It is the first Catholic technical institute in India to acquire minority status.

Invocation

Courses

Graduate courses 
Each department listed below offers courses in their respective disciplines towards a BE degree.

 Electronics and telecommunications (E&T)
 B.E. (Computer Engineering)
 B.E. (Information Technology)
 B.E. (Electrical Engineering)
 B.E. (Mechanical Engineering)

Admissions for Electrical & Mechanical Engineering started in June–July 2018. The 2022 graduating B.E. class will be the very first to have companies specifically coming for campus placements only pertaining to that respective field.

Postgraduate courses 
Each department listed below offers courses in their respective disciplines towards an ME degree.

 M. E. (Computer Engineering)
 M. E. (Electronics and Telecommunication Engineering)

Courses for the PhD in Technology 
Each department listed below offers courses in their respective disciplines towards a PhD degree.

 PhD (Computer Engineering)
 PhD (Electronics and Telecommunication Engineering).

Campus 
The institute has an open access library, a gymkhana with a table tennis room, a carrom room, and a chess room. There are facilities for outdoor games like throwball, football, basketball, volleyball, and badminton.

PhD (Technology) Degree courses
Each department listed below offers courses in their respective disciplines towards a PhD degree:

 PhD (Computer Engineering)
 PhD (Electronics and Telecommunication Engineering)

Campus 
The institute has an open access library, gymkhana with a table tennis room, carrom room and a chess room. There are facilities for outdoor games like throwball, football, basketball, volleyball and badminton.

See also
University of Mumbai
List of Mumbai Colleges

References

DTE

External links
Official website

Engineering colleges in Mumbai
Affiliates of the University of Mumbai